Francis Mathew may refer to:
 Francis Mathew, 1st Earl Landaff, Anglo-Irish politician and peer
 Francis Mathew, 2nd Earl Landaff, Irish peer and politician

See also
 Matthew Francis (disambiguation)
 Francis Matthews (disambiguation)